Sunita Gajmer is an Indian politician. She was elected to the Sikkim Legislative Assembly from Zoom Salghari in the 2019 Sikkim Legislative Assembly election as a member of the Sikkim Krantikari Morcha.

References

1978 births
Living people
Sikkim Krantikari Morcha politicians
People from Namchi district
Sikkim MLAs 2019–2024